Timofei Silistaru (born in 1894 in Taraclia) was a Bessarabian politician. He served as Member of the Moldovan Parliament (1917–1918).

Sources

Bibliography
Gheorghe E. Cojocaru, Sfatul Țării: itinerar, Civitas, Chişinău, 1998, 
Mihai Taşcă, Sfatul Țării şi actualele autorităţi locale, "Timpul de dimineaţă", no. 114 (849), June 27, 2008 (page 16)

External links
 Arhiva pentru Sfatul Tarii
 Deputaţii Sfatului Ţării şi Lavrenti Beria

Notes

Moldovan MPs 1917–1918
People from Taraclia District
Year of death missing
1894 births